In mathematics, the Farrell–Markushevich theorem, proved independently by O. J. Farrell (1899–1981) and A. I. Markushevich (1908–1979) in 1934, is a result concerning the approximation in mean square of holomorphic functions on a bounded open set in the complex plane by complex polynomials. It states that complex polynomials form a dense subspace of the Bergman space of a domain  bounded by a simple closed Jordan curve. The Gram–Schmidt process can be used to construct an orthonormal basis in the Bergman space  and hence an explicit form of the Bergman kernel, which in turn yields an explicit Riemann mapping function for the domain.

Proof
Let Ω be the bounded Jordan domain and let  Ωn be bounded Jordan domains decreasing to Ω, with Ωn containing the closure of  Ωn + 1. By the Riemann mapping theorem there is a conformal mapping fn of Ωn onto  Ω, normalised to fix a given point in Ω with positive derivative there. By the Carathéodory kernel theorem fn(z) converges uniformly on compacta in Ω to z. In fact Carathéodory's theorem implies that the inverse maps tend uniformly on compacta to z. Given a subsequence of fn, it has a subsequence, convergent on compacta in Ω. Since the inverse functions converge to z, it follows that the subsequence converges to z on compacta. Hence  fn converges to z on compacta in Ω.

As a consequence the derivative of fn tends to 1 uniformly on compacta.

Let g be a square integrable holomorphic function on  Ω, i.e. an element of the Bergman space A2(Ω). Define gn on Ωn by gn(z) = g(fn(z))fn'(z). By change of variable

Let hn be the restriction of gn to Ω. Then the norm of hn is less than that of gn. Thus these norms  are uniformly bounded. Passing to a subsequence if necessary, it can therefore be assumed that hn has a weak limit in A2(Ω). On the other hand, hn tends uniformly on compacta
to g. Since the evaluation maps are continuous linear functions on  A2(Ω), g is the weak limit of hn. On the other hand, by Runge's theorem,  hn lies in the closed subspace K of A2(Ω) generated by complex polynomials. Hence g lies in the weak closure of K, which is K itself.

See also
 Mergelyan's theorem

Notes

References

Theorems in functional analysis
Operator theory
Theorems in complex analysis